
Gmina Gryfice is an urban-rural gmina (administrative district) in Gryfice County, West Pomeranian Voivodeship, in north-western Poland.

Villages
Apart from the town of Gryfice, Gmina Gryfice contains the villages and settlements of Barkowo, Baszewice, Borzęcin, Borzyszewo, Brodniki, Dobrzyń, Dziadowo, Górzyca, Grądy, Grębocin, Grochów, Jabłonowo, Jasiel, Kołomąć, Kowalewo, Krakowice, Kukań, Łopianów, Lubieszewo, Lubin, Lubków, Mierzyn, Niedźwiedziska, Niekładź, Ościęcin, Otok, Podłęcze, Popiele, Prusinowo, Przybiernówko, Raduń, Rotnowo, Rybokarty, Rzęsin, Rzęskowo, Sikory, Skalin, Skowrony, Smolęcin, Sokołów, Stawno, Świeszewo, Trzygłów, Waniorowo, Wilczkowo, Witno, Wołczyno, Zacisze, Zagórcze, Zaleszczyce and Zielin.

Neighbouring gminas
Gmina Gryfice is bordered by the gminas of Brojce, Golczewo, Karnice, Płoty, Świerzno and Trzebiatów.

References
Polish official population figures 2006

Gryfice
Gryfice County